Republic road I-7 is a major road in Eastern Bulgaria. It runs between Silistra, at the Danube border with Romania, and the Lesovo border crossing to Turkey. The part of the road that crosses the Balkan Mountains through the Varbitsa Pass is in a very bad condition and in winter it closes for traffic.

References

External links
Road network of Bulgaria at RIA
Detailed road maps of Bulgaria Bulgarian Visitor Information website

Roads in Bulgaria